Crash  is a novel by English author J. G. Ballard, first published in 1973 with cover designed by Bill Botten. It is a story about car-crash sexual fetishism: its protagonists become sexually aroused by staging and participating in real car crashes, inspired by the famous crashes of celebrities.

In 1996, the novel was made into a film of the same name by David Cronenberg.

Synopsis
The story is told through the eyes of narrator James Ballard, named after the author himself, but it centers on the sinister figure of Dr. Robert Vaughan, a "former TV-scientist, turned nightmare angel of the expressways". James meets Vaughan after being injured in a car crash near London Airport. Gathering around Vaughan is a group of alienated people, all of them former crash victims, who follow him in his pursuit to re-enact the crashes of Hollywood celebrities such as Jayne Mansfield and James Dean, in order to experience what the narrator calls "a new sexuality, born from a perverse technology". Vaughan's ultimate fantasy is to die in a head-on collision with movie star Elizabeth Taylor.

Critical reception
The novel received divided reviews when originally published. One publisher's reader returned the verdict "This author is beyond psychiatric help. Do Not Publish!" A 1973 review in The New York Times was equally horrified: "Crash is, hands-down, the most repulsive book I've yet to come across."

However, retrospective opinion now considers Crash to be one of Ballard's best and most challenging works. Reassessing Crash in The Guardian, Zadie Smith wrote, "Crash is an existential book about how everybody uses everything. How everything uses everybody. And yet it is not a hopeless vision." On Ballard's legacy, she writes: "In Ballard's work there is always this mix of futuristic dread and excitement, a sweet spot where dystopia and utopia converge. For we cannot say we haven't got precisely what we dreamed of, what we always wanted, so badly."

The Papers of J.G. Ballard at the British Library include two revised drafts of Crash (Add MS 88938/3/8). Scanned extracts from Ballard's drafts are included in Crash: The Collector's Edition, ed. Chris Beckett.

Interpretation

Crash has been difficult to characterize as a novel. At some points in his career, Ballard claimed that Crash was a "cautionary tale", a view that he would later regret, asserting that it is in fact "a psychopathic hymn. But it is a psychopathic hymn which has a point”. Likewise, Ballard previously characterized it a science fiction novel, a position he would later take back.

Jean Baudrillard wrote an analysis of Crash in Simulacra and Simulation in which he declared it "the first great novel of the universe of simulation". He made note of how the fetish in the story conflates the functionality of the automobiles with that of the human body and how the characters' injuries and the damage to the vehicles are used as equivalent signs. To him, the hyperfunctionality leads to the dysfunction in the story. Quotes were used extensively to illustrate that the language of the novel employs plain, mechanical terms for the parts of the automobile and proper, medical language for human sex organs and acts. The story is interpreted as showing a merger between technology, sexuality, and death, and he further argued that by pointing out Vaughan's character takes and keeps photos of the car crashes and the mutilated bodies involved. Baudrillard stated that there is no moral judgment about the events within the novel but that Ballard himself intended it as a warning against a cultural trend.

References in popular art

Music
The Normal's 1978 song "Warm Leatherette" was inspired by the novel as was "Miss the Girl," a 1983 single by The Creatures.
The Manic Street Preachers' song "Mausoleum" from 1994's The Holy Bible contains the famous Ballard quote about his reasons for writing the book, "I wanted to rub the human face in its own vomit. I wanted to force it to look in the mirror." John Foxx's album Metamatic contains songs that have Ballardian themes, such as "No-one Driving".

Other film adaptations
An apparently unauthorized adaptation of Crash called Nightmare Angel was filmed in 1986 by Susan Emerling and Zoe Beloff. This short film bears the credit "Inspired by J.G. Ballard".

See also

Autassassinophilia

References

External links

 The Terminal Collection: JG Ballard First Editions
Crash at the British Library

1973 British novels
1973 science fiction novels
Adultery in novels
Books about cars
BDSM literature
Bisexuality-related fiction
British erotic novels
British novels adapted into films
Jonathan Cape books
Postmodern novels
Psychological novels
Novels about necrophilia
Novels by J. G. Ballard
Obscenity controversies in literature
Pedophilia in literature
Sexual addiction in fiction 
Casual sex in fiction
Female bisexuality in fiction
Male bisexuality in fiction
Science fiction erotica
LGBT speculative fiction novels
LGBT novels
Novels with transgender themes
Novels with gay themes
Novels about technology
Works about cars